"Mientes" (English: You Lie) is a Spanish language song by Mexican pop group Camila released as the lead single from their second studio album, Dejarte de Amar (2010) released on November 16, 2009 through Sony Music, the song was written by Mario Domm and Mónica Vélez. The song was also part of the soundtrack of Mexican telenovela Corazón Salvaje (2009-2010). The song received two Latin Grammy Awards for Song of the Year and Record of the Year.

Commercial performance
The song peaked at number four on the Hot Latin Tracks, number one on the Top Latin Pop Songs and number 21 on the Tropical Songs, becoming on their most successful single to date on the US Billboard charts. The song also topped the Mexican Airplay Chart and peaked at number 11 on the Spanish Singles Chart, where was certified Gold, more than 20.000 copies, on March 15, 2014.

Music video
 
The music video was directed by Ricardo Calderón and filmed at colonia San Rafael in Mexico City. The video features the group playing the theme and in parallel the story of a couple living misunderstandings, disappointments and lies that lead to loss. A set of infidelity and indifference between a model and a rockstar.

Accolades

Track listing
iTunes Digital download
 "Mientes" (Mario Domm, Mónica Vélez) - 3:25

Charts

Weekly charts

Year-end charts

Certifications

Release history

See also
List of number-one songs of 2010 (Mexico)

References

External links
"Mientes" music video at YouTube.com

2009 singles
Camila (band) songs
Pop ballads
Songs written by Mario Domm
Monitor Latino Top General number-one singles
Latin Grammy Award for Record of the Year
Latin Grammy Award for Song of the Year
Spanish-language songs
Sony Music Latin singles
2009 songs
Songs written by Mónica Vélez